Emile Smith (born 27 September 1977) is a South African former field hockey player who competed in the 2004 Summer Olympics and in the 2008 Summer Olympics.

References

External links

1977 births
Living people
South African male field hockey players
Olympic field hockey players of South Africa
2002 Men's Hockey World Cup players
Field hockey players at the 2004 Summer Olympics
Field hockey players at the 2008 Summer Olympics
Field hockey players at the 1998 Commonwealth Games
Field hockey players at the 2002 Commonwealth Games
Commonwealth Games competitors for South Africa